Marcus Törnstrand (born 10 January 1990) is a Swedish footballer who plays as a defender, most recently for Östersunds FK in 2014. He previously played for Hammarby IF and in Scotland for Dundee United. He represented the Sweden under-21 team.

Career
As a youth player he represented Djurgårdens IF and IF Brommapojkarna before signing a contract with Hammarby IF in 2008. During the spring in 2008 he played for the club's farm team Hammarby TFF, but due to big injury problems in Hammarby's defensive line he was called up and played seven games for the team during the autumn. He only made one appearance for the team in 2009 in the spring derby against the club's rivals AIK. He also helped Hammarby TFF to gain promotion to Division 1 during the season.

After being released by Hammarby at the end of the 2012 season, Törnstrand signed a short-term contract with Dundee United of the Scottish Premier League on 26 February 2013. He made only one appearance as a substitute before leaving the club at the end of the 2012–13 season.

Törnstrand returned to Sweden, signing for Östersunds FK in June 2013. He left the club at the end of the 2014 season after they decided not to extend his contract.

References

External links
 

1990 births
Swedish footballers
Hammarby Talang FF players
Hammarby Fotboll players
Allsvenskan players
Superettan players
Dundee United F.C. players
Living people
Swedish expatriate footballers
Expatriate footballers in Scotland
Scottish Premier League players
Sweden under-21 international footballers
Footballers from Stockholm
Association football defenders
Östersunds FK players